Jatuarana River is a river of Amazonas state in north-western Brazil, a tributary of the Manicoré River.

The river flows through the  Manicoré Biological Reserve, created by decree in May 2016 in the week before the provisional removal of president Dilma Rousseff.
The reserve was created in part to preserve the biodiversity of the Jatuarana.

See also
List of rivers of Amazonas

References

Rivers of Amazonas (Brazilian state)